The Gabbs Formation is a geologic formation in Nevada. It preserves fossils dating back to the Late Triassic and Early Jurassic periods, and is one of the few formations in the United States known to include the Triassic-Jurassic boundary. In 2007, an exposure of the Gabbs Formation at New York Canyon was proposed a candidate GSSP for the Hettangian stage, the first stage of the Jurassic. However, the New York Canyon section was ultimately not selected as Hettangian GSSP, which instead went to the Kuhjoch section (Kendlbach Formation) of Austria in 2010.

Fossil content 
The Gabbs Formation hosts several diverse assemblages of ammonites, bivalves, and other invertebrates. In 2021, several ammonites were newly described from the formation:
 Arcestes lawsi
 Paracochloceras nunminensis
 Peripleurites gabbensis
 Placites heggi
 Rhacophyllites mulleri
 R. volcanoensis

See also 

 List of fossiliferous stratigraphic units in Nevada
 Paleontology in Nevada

References 

Geologic formations of Nevada
Triassic System of North America
Norian Stage
Rhaetian Stage
Jurassic System of North America
Hettangian Stage
Limestone formations of the United States
Mudstone formations
Siltstone formations
Shallow marine deposits
Open marine deposits
Paleontology in Nevada